Cape Robertson, also known as Tuloriok, is a headland in Northwest Greenland, Avannaata municipality.

Geography
Cape Robertson is located in the northern shore of Murchison Sound, Baffin Bay. it rises at the end of a promontory, south of the fjord where the Morris Jesup Glacier has its terminus, east of the mouth of Robertson Fjord and west of MacCormick Fjord.

References

External links
 Greenland Pilot - Danish Geodata Agency

Robertson